Ctesicles was the author of a chronological work (Chronika or Chronoi), of which two fragments are preserved in Athenaeus.

Ctesicles was also a sculptor, who made a statue at Samos and an Athenian general

References

Ancient Greek historians known only from secondary sources
Chronologists
Hellenistic-era historians
Ancient Greek sculptors
Ancient Athenian generals